Archale is a village development committee in Palpa District in the Lumbini Zone of southern Nepal. At the time of the 1991 Nepal census it had a population of 2373 people living in 378 individual households.

2015 Nepal earthquake

The village was affected by an earthquake on 25 April 2015. Reports from the area indicate that the village has been left in ruins after the earthquake. A wedding was taking place in the village when the earthquake occurred. Fifteen of the wedding guests were killed. Twenty-two houses were destroyed. Most of the houses that were destroyed are ill-constructed houses made of mud, brick and stone.

References

Populated places in Palpa District